The second USS Panay (PR–5) of the United States Navy was a Panay-class river gunboat that served on the Yangtze Patrol in China until sunk by Japanese aircraft on 12 December 1937 on the Yangtze River.

The vessel was built by Kiangnan Dockyard and Engineering Works, Shanghai, China, and launched on 10 November 1927. She was sponsored by Mrs. Ellis S. Stone and commissioned on 10 September 1928.

History
 
Built for duty in the Asiatic Fleet on the Yangtze River, Panay had as her primary mission the protection of American lives and property frequently threatened in the disturbances that the 1920s and 1930s brought to a China struggling to modernize, create a strong central government, and later counter Japanese aggression. Throughout Panay’s service, navigation on the Yangtze was constantly menaced by bandits and soldier outlaws, and Panay and her sister ships provided protection for U.S. shipping and nationals, as other foreign forces did for their citizens. 
Often detachments from Panay served as armed guards on American steamers plying the river. In 1931, her commanding officer, Lieutenant Commander R. A. Dyer, reported, "Firing on gunboats and merchant ships have [sic] become so routine that any vessel traversing the Yangtze River sails with the expectation of being fired upon. Fortunately," he added, "the Chinese appear to be rather poor marksmen and the ship has, so far, not sustained any casualties in these engagements."

As the Japanese moved through south China, American gunboats evacuated most of the embassy staff from NanJing during November 1937. Panay was assigned as station ship to guard the remaining Americans and take them off at the last moment. Panay evacuated the remaining Americans from the city on 11 December, bringing the number of people aboard to five officers, 54 enlisted men, four US embassy staff, and 10 civilians, including Universal News cameraman Norman Alley, Movietone News’ Eric Mayell, the New York Times's Norman Soong, Collier's Weekly correspondent Jim Marshall, La Stampa correspondent Sandro Sandri and Corriere della Sera correspondent Luigi Barzini Jr. Panay moved upriver to avoid becoming involved in the fighting around the doomed capital. Three U.S. merchant tankers sailed with her. The Japanese senior naval commander in Shanghai was informed both before and after the fact of this movement.

Sunk by the Japanese

On 12 December 1937, Japanese naval aircraft were ordered by their Army to attack "any and all ships" in the Yangtze above NanJing. Knowing of the presence of Panay and the merchantmen, the Imperial Japanese Navy requested verification of the order, which was received before the attack began about 13:27 that day. Although there were several large US flags flown on the ship as well as one painted atop the cabin, the Japanese planes continued strafing and bombing. Panay was hit by two of the eighteen  bombs dropped by three Yokosuka B4Y Type-96 bombers and strafed by nine Nakajima A4N Type-95 fighters. The bombing continued until Panay sank at 15:54. Storekeeper First Class Charles L. Ensminger, Standard Oil tanker captain Carl H. Carlson and Italian reporter Sandro Sandri were killed, Coxswain Edgar C. Hulsebus died later that night. 43 sailors and five civilians were wounded. Panay'''s lifeboats were machine-gunned by Japanese fighter planes in the attack.

Two newsreel cameramen were present on Panay, Norman Alley (Universal News) and Eric Mayell (Movietone News), and were able to take considerable film during the attack and afterward from shore as Panay sank in the middle of the river. The newsreels are now available online at usspanay.org (see external links below).
 
A formal protest was immediately lodged by the U.S. ambassador. The Japanese government accepted responsibility, but insisted the attack was unintentional. They claimed that the pilots could not distinguish between Chinese and U.S. flags from the distance of 300 or more yards that the pilots attacked. A large indemnity was paid (approximately $2,000,000, which is equal to $ today) on 22 April 1938 and the incident was officially settled; however, further deterioration of relations between Japan and the United States continued.

Fon Huffman, the last survivor of the incident, died in September 2008.

Awards
Navy Expeditionary Medal (12 Dec 1937)
Yangtze Service Medal (1 Mar 1930 - 31 Dec 1932)
China Service Medal (7 Jul 1937 - 12 Dec 1937)

See also
List of patrol vessels of the United States Navy
List of World War II ships of less than 1000 tons
The Sand Pebbles (film) A film based on a novel about an American gunboat during the 1920s in China

Notes

Further reading

Peifer, Douglas Carl. (2016). Choosing war: presidential decisions in the Maine, Lusitania, and Panay incidents.'' New York, NY: Oxford University Press.  ISBN 978-0190939601
Peifer, Douglas Carl (2018) . "Presidential Crisis Decision Making Following the Sinking of the Panay." International Journal of Naval History 14, no. 2/November .

External links
USSPanay.org memorial website regarding USS Panay and Panay incident
NavSource Online: Gunboat Photo Archive: USS Panay (PR-5), ex-PG-45
Archive.org Universal Newsreel's 22-minute film by newsreel cameraman Norman Alley
Sinking of the US Gunboat "Panay" by Japanese Bombers 7:28- minute film by British Movietone

Panay (PR-5)
World War II patrol vessels of the United States
Ships sunk by Japanese aircraft
Ships built in China
Second Sino-Japanese War naval ships
Maritime incidents in 1937
Shipwrecks in rivers
Shipwrecks of China
1927 ships
Riverine warfare
Gunboats sunk by aircraft